HD 50235 is a class K5III (orange giant) star located approximately 811 light years away, in the constellation Puppis. Its apparent magnitude is 4.99. HD 50235 made its closest approach to the Sun 7.8 million years ago, at the distance of 137 light years, during which it had an apparent magnitude of 1.13.

References

Puppis
K-type giants
CD-34 3140
032855
2549
050235